Soho Baptist Chapel is a church at 166a Shaftesbury Avenue, London, on the corner with Mercer Street. Originally a Baptist church (which relocated to North Finchley now called High Road Baptist Church). It is now the Chinese Church in London.

History
The church was built in 1887–88 to a design by the architect William Gillbee Scott for a Strict Baptist church that had been formed in 1791. In 1916–17, it was sold to another Strict Baptist church, after their 99-year lease on a chapel in Gower Street came to an end, and became the Gower Street Memorial Chapel.

It is now the Chinese Church in London, Soho Outreach Centre.

References

External links

Former Baptist churches in England
Churches in the City of Westminster
Chinese community in the United Kingdom